Bob Lueck (born March 3, 1943) is an American-born Canadian football player who played for the Calgary Stampeders and Winnipeg Blue Bombers. He previously played football at Arizona State University.

References

1943 births
Living people
Calgary Stampeders players
Winnipeg Blue Bombers players
Arizona State Sun Devils football players